The Alexander Eaglerock was a biplane produced in the United States in the 1920s by Alexander Aircraft Company of Colorado Springs, Colorado.

Surviving aircraft

 122 – Model 24 Long Wing on static display at the Pueblo Weisbrod Aircraft Museum in Pueblo, Colorado. It is on loan from the Colorado Aviation Historical Society and was previously on display at the Wings Over the Rockies Air and Space Museum.
 469 – Combo-wing on static display at Seattle-Tacoma International Airport in SeaTac, Washington. It is on loan from the Museum of Flight.
 526 – Long Wing airworthy at the Western Antique Aeroplane & Automobile Museum in Hood River, Oregon.
 928 – A-2 on static display at the Science Spectrum in Lubbock, Texas.
 977 – Model A-14 is on static display in Concourse B of Denver International Airport in Denver, Colorado. It was restored over a 25-year period by the Antique Airplane Association of Colorado.
 On static display at the Wings Over the Rockies Air and Space Museum in Denver, Colorado.

Specifications (Eaglerock A-1)

See also

Aircraft of comparable role, configuration and era 
(Partial listing, only covers most numerous types)

American Eagle A-101
Brunner-Winkle Bird
Buhl-Verville CA-3 Airster
Command-Aire 3C3
Parks P-1
Pitcairn Mailwing
Spartan C3
Stearman C2 and C3
Swallow New Swallow
Travel Air 2000 and 4000
Waco 10

Related lists 

 List of aircraft
 List of civil aircraft

References

Citations

Bibliography

Biplanes